Duryunsan is a mountain of Jeollanam-do, western South Korea. It has an elevation of 700 metres.

See also
List of mountains of Korea

References

Mountains of South Korea
Mountains of South Jeolla Province